Schapira is a surname. Notable people with the surname include:

Eliezer Isaac Schapira (1835–1915), Hebrew writer and publisher
Pierre Schapira (politician) (born 1944), French politician
Pierre Schapira (mathematician) (born 1943), French mathematician
David Schapira (born 1980), American politician

Jewish surnames
Yiddish-language surnames